Kanesha Nichole Brookes (born October 5, 1984), better known by her stage name Brooke Valentine, is an American singer, actress, and model. Her single "Girlfight" peaked on U.S. music charts in 2005, paving the way for her debut album Chain Letter released via Subliminal Entertainment imprint on Virgin Records and went on to sell more than 290,000 units worldwide. After a first attempt at a comeback, Brooke officially returned to the spotlight in 2012 with two singles "Forever" and the Adult R&B Top 40 hit "Don't Wanna Be In Love".

Biography

1984–2004: Early life and career beginnings 
Valentine was born in Houston, Texas She started her musical career as a member of the female group Best Kept Secret. To pursue a solo career, she moved to Los Angeles, California with producer and Subliminal Entertainment CEO Deja the Great and signed to Virgin Records.

2004–2006: Chain Letter 
Brooke Valentine made her debut with the hit single, "Girlfight", which featured Lil Jon and Big Boi, which peaked at #23 on the Billboard Hot 100 and #13 on the R&B chart. It succeeded internationally, peaking in the Top 50 in Australia and Ireland, and Top 40 in New Zealand and the United Kingdom. She then released her debut album Chain Letter in 2005 which debuted at #16 on the US Billboard 200 and #3 on the U.S. Billboard Top R&B/Hip Hop Albums charts. A follow-up single "Long as You Come Home" peaked at #71 on the US R&B/Hip-Hop chart, while a third (the ballad "Covergirl") was released digitally but not sent to radio.

Later that year, collaborated with rappers Fabolous and Yo Yo on the single "Boogie Oogie Oogie" for the Roll Bounce soundtrack.

2006–2009: Physical Education 
In 2006, Valentine set work on her second studio album, Physical Education. She released the set's lead single "D-Girl" featuring Pimp C that year, peaking at #92 on the Billboard R&B/Hip Hop Singles chart. A follow-up single "Pimped Out" featuring Dem Franchize Boyz was released but failed to catch on.

Eventually, the Physical Education project was put on hold due to Virgin Records’ merger with Capitol Records in 2008. Subliminal Entertainment CEO Deja the Great then acquired the masters and the contract rights from Virgin Records, and material from the project was released independently on the Physical Education Mixtape in 2009.

She later said in an interview that the project was a "paper album" with Virgin, as it was a forced effort due to her being on the label's timeline for a new release and being set up with all the "hot" producers at the time. In addition to not turning in the complete album to the label, Valentine was also dealing with the death of her cousin during the "D-Girl" single release, all of which added to the album not being initially released.

2010–2013: Forever / Love Letters EP 
In a 2010 interview, Valentine said that she took a break and has been writing music for other artists, and was now working on new material.

That year, she also gave birth to her first child, a son named London. In 2012, she did an interview with Essence Magazine discussing raising her son's cerebral palsy diagnosis. She also penned an open letter to him with Ebony Magazine, calling him her "tiny hero."

Adding to her stage name the alias B. Valentine, she released a music video for the song "Insanity" in January 2012, shot entirely on an Apple iPad and directed by Subliminal CEO Deja the Great. She announced a new album titled Forever set for release later in the year, led by a new single "Forever" which premiered on February 14, 2012. "Rub It In" (a collaboration with Tyrese) was announced as the set's second single and released as a digital single, but the album was later pushed back in lieu of a new project.

In 2013, she released a new EP titled Love Letters which garnered a positive response. A single from the set, "Don't Wanna Be In Love" was released and peaked at #29 on the Billboard Adult R&B chart, marking her first chart appearance in six years.

2014–present: New projects and Love & Hip-Hop 
In 2014, she filmed scenes for the L.A.-spin off cast of VH1's hit reality series Love & Hip Hop, but ultimately did not make the cut. Since then, she's been working on her second studio album.

In 2016, she released a series of new digital singles, with "Grow Up" on April 29, "#CRAIG" (produced by Yonni) on July 2, and "Games" on October 5.

In June 2017, it was confirmed she will appear on the new season of VH1's popular series Love & Hip Hop: Hollywood alongside newcomers Keyshia Cole and Chanel West Coast. She was promoted to a series regular on season five.

Discography 

 Chain Letter (2005)
 Physical Education – Mixtape (2009)
 Love Letters – EP (2013)

References

External links 
 
 

1984 births
Living people
Actresses from Houston
Actresses from Los Angeles
African-American actresses
African-American crunk musicians
African-American female models
American female models
African-American women singer-songwriters
American women singer-songwriters
American dance musicians
American film actresses
American contemporary R&B singers
American television actresses
Female models from California
Musicians from Houston
Musicians from Los Angeles
Singer-songwriters from California
Singer-songwriters from Texas
Female models from Texas
21st-century American women singers
21st-century American singers
21st-century African-American women singers
20th-century African-American people
20th-century African-American women